Carolina Pini (born 13 June 1988, in Florence, Italy) is an Italian soccer player who most recently played as a midfielder for ASDCF Bardolino and the Italian national team.

Career
Pini began playing soccer as a kid. Her first team was Floriagafir (together with boys), when 12 years old, she went to ACF Firenze where she stayed two years. Then she played in Agliana for four years, in 2007 she went to the women team of Bayern München. After spending four seasons in the Frauen-Bundesliga in 2011 she returned to the Serie A, signing for ASDCF Bardolino.

In 2013 Pini did not extend her deal with Bardolino and left the club.

International career
Pini played in the juvenile Italian national team ("under 19", first match in January 2005 vs Portugal), since 2006 she has been playing for the Italian national team, her first game being a 7-0 win against Serbia Montenegro.
On 2 October 2010, he scored against Ukraine for the FIFA Women's World Cup qualification at the Stadion Yuri Gagarin in Chernihiv.

Notes

1988 births
Living people
Footballers from Florence
Italian women's footballers
Italy women's international footballers
Italian expatriate sportspeople in Germany
FC Bayern Munich (women) players
Expatriate women's footballers in Germany
Serie A (women's football) players
A.S.D. AGSM Verona F.C. players
Women's association football midfielders
ACF Firenze players